Richard C. Dorf (born December 27, 1933, in the Bronx, New York City, died October 22, 2020) was a professor emeritus of management and electrical and computer engineering at the University of California, Davis. He received his Ph.D. from the U.S. Naval Postgraduate School. Dorf was a Life Fellow of the IEEE for contributions to engineering education and control theory, and was a fellow of the American Society for Engineering Education.

Career

Research and academia
Dorf researched and taught control systems, robotics, energy systems, technology management, entrepreneurship, innovation management, non-profit management, new venture management, venture capital management, and technology policy. He was also a consultant in engineering business development, and taught classes in the area as well.

Author and editor
Dorf was a prolific author and editor. He has authored 30 books, including several standard handbooks and textbooks of engineering. His latest book is called Technology Ventures: From Ideas to Enterprise and is co-authored with Professor Thomas Byers of Stanford University; the textbook is the first to thoroughly examine a global phenomenon known as "technology entrepreneurship".

Works

Books authored by Dorf include:
 Technology Ventures: From Ideas to Enterprise. McGraw Hill, 2004 (1st ed), 2008 (2nd ed), 2011 (3rd ed)   
 Modern Control Systems. Addison-Wesley, 1967 (1st ed.); current edition Pearson, 2016 (13th ed.) 
 Computers and Man 
 Pocket Book of Electrical Engineering Formulas
 Introduction to Electric Circuits
 Circuits Electrics
 The New Mutual Fund Investment Adviser
 Robotics and Automated Manufacturing

Books edited by Dorf include: 
 Electrical Engineering Handbook

References

1933 births
2020 deaths
People from the Bronx
University of California, Davis faculty
Fellow Members of the IEEE
Fellows of the American Society for Engineering Education
Naval Postgraduate School alumni